Ekaterina Makarova and Elena Vesnina were the defending champions, but Makarova decided not to participate. Vesnina played alongside Eugenie Bouchard, but they withdrew from their second round match because of a concussion sustained by Bouchard.

Martina Hingis and Sania Mirza won their second Grand Slam doubles title together, defeating Casey Dellacqua and Yaroslava Shvedova in the final, 6–3, 6–3.

Seeds

Draw

Finals

Top half

Section 1

Section 2

Bottom half

Section 3

Section 4

References

External links
Draw
2015 US Open – Women's draws and results at the International Tennis Federation

Women's Doubles
US Open - Women's Doubles
US Open (tennis) by year – Women's doubles
2015 in women's tennis
2015 in American women's sports